The Big Ten Tournament Most Outstanding Player is an annual award given out at the conclusion of the Big Ten Conference Tournament to the best player in the championship as voted by a media panel and the head coaches of each team.

The Most Outstanding Player was first awarded in 2014 and is a successor to the CCHA Most Valuable Player in Tournament which was discontinued after the conference dissolved due to the 2013–14 NCAA conference realignment.

Award winners

Winners by school

Winners by position

References 

Big Ten Men's Ice Hockey Tournament
College ice hockey trophies and awards in the United States